Samolus (known as brookweed, or water pimpernel) is a widely distributed genus of about a dozen species of water-loving herbs. According to the APG III classification, this genus belongs to the family Primulaceae in the order Ericales. It was considered as closely related to a clade comprising the Theophrastaceae, and was treated as part of that family or in its own monogeneric family, the Samolaceae. The APG III system does not recognize these families and instead includes all genera formerly belonging to Theophrastaceae in the family Primulaceae.

Species
The last complete taxonomic treatment of this genus recognizes the following species:

Although some local floras recognize the North-American populations of S. valerandi as a separate species (S. parviflorus) or subspecies (S. valerandi ssp. parviflorus), molecular and morphological data indicate that S. vagans and S. parviflorus should not be regarded as separate species but as part of a widespread "S. valerandi species complex.

References

Bibliography  

 

 
Primulaceae genera